The Parliament of Tasmania is the bicameral legislature of the Australian state of Tasmania. It follows a Westminster-derived parliamentary system and consists of the Governor of Tasmania, the Tasmanian House of Assembly (the lower house), and Tasmanian Legislative Council (the upper house). Since 1841, both Houses have met in Parliament House, Hobart. The Parliament of Tasmania first met in 1856.

The powers of the Parliament are prescribed in the Constitution of Tasmania, as amended from time to time. Since the Federation of Australia in 1901, Tasmania has been a state of the Commonwealth of Australia, and the Constitution of Australia regulates its relationship with the Commonwealth. Under the Australian Constitution, Tasmania ceded certain legislative and judicial powers to the Commonwealth, but retained complete independence in all other areas. In practice, however, the independence of the Australian states has been greatly eroded by the increasing financial domination of the Commonwealth.

The leader of the party or coalition with the confidence of the House of Assembly is invited by the Governor to form the Government and become Premier of Tasmania.

History
The island of Van Diemen's Land (now known as Tasmania) was claimed and subsequently settled by the United Kingdom in 1803. Initially, it was administered by the Governor of New South Wales, as part of that British Colony of New South Wales. In 1825, Van Diemen's Land became a separate British colony, administered separately from New South Wales, with a Legislative Council of six men appointed to advise the Lieutenant Governor of Van Diemen's Land who had sole governance of the colony. The Council initially held meetings in a room adjacent to the old Government House that was located near to the present site of Franklin Square, but by 1841 they relocated meetings to the 'Long Room' (now the Members' Lounge) in the Customs House.

In 1850, the British Parliament enacted the Australian Colonies Government Act, which gave Van Diemen's Land the right to elect its first representative government. The size of the Legislative Council was increased from six to 24. Eight members were appointed by the Governor, and 16 were elected by property owners. The new Legislative Council met for the first time in 1852, and by 1854 they had passed the Tasmanian Constitution Act, giving Van Diemen's Land responsible self-government and a new bicameral parliament. Queen Victoria granted Royal assent in 1855 and Van Diemen's Land became a self-governing colony. In the following year, 1856, one of the new parliament's first acts was to change the name of the colony from Van Diemen's Land to Tasmania.

Houses of Parliament

House of Assembly

The Tasmanian House of Assembly is the lower house of the Tasmanian Parliament. There are 25 members, with five members elected from each of the 5 divisions. The divisions are: Bass, Braddon, Denison, Franklin, and Lyons. The Tasmanian House of Assembly electoral divisions share the same names and boundaries as the Australian House of Representatives divisions for Tasmania.

Members are elected using the Hare-Clark voting system of multi-member proportional representation for a term of up to 4 years.

Current distribution of seats
The distribution of seats as a result of the 2021 state election is:

Legislative Council

The Tasmanian Legislative Council is the upper house of the Tasmanian Parliament. It has 15 members, each elected from a single-member electoral division. The boundaries of the divisions are reviewed by tribunal every 9 years.

Elections are conducted annually on a 6-year periodic cycle; 3 divisions will be up for election in May one year, then 2 divisions in May the following year and so on. As such, each member will normally serve a term of 6 years.

Current distribution of seats
The current distribution of seats (updated post May 2021 elections) is:

See also
 Parliaments of the Australian states and territories
 Official Openings by the Monarch in Australia

Notes

References

External links

 Parliament of Tasmania

 
Tasmania